Ania Hertel and Anastasiya Shoshyna were the defending champions but Shoshyna was unable to participate due to a doping suspension. Hertel partnered alongside Martyna Kubka, but lost in the semifinals to Bárbara Gatica and Rebeca Pereira.

Gatica and Pereira went on to win the title, defeating Jang Su-jeong and Lee Ya-hsuan in the final, 6–3, 6–1.

Seeds

Draw

Draw

References
Main Draw

Kozerki Open - Doubles